A fetch, based in Irish folklore, is a supernatural double or an apparition of a living person. The sighting of a fetch is regarded as an omen, usually for impending death.

Description
The fetch is described as an exact, spectral double of a living human, whose appearance is regarded as ominous. A sighting of a fetch is generally taken as a portent of its exemplar's looming death, though John and Michael Banim report that if the double appears in the morning rather than the evening, it is instead a sign of a long life in store. As such, it is similar to the Germanic doppelgänger and to some conceptions of the British wraith. Francis Grose associated the term with Northern England in his 1787 Provincial Glossary, but otherwise it seems to have been in popular use only in Ireland.

Origins and etymology
The etymology of fetch is obscure and the origin of the term is unknown. It may derive from the verb "fetch"; the compound "fetch-life", evidently referring to a psychopomp who "fetches" the souls of the dying, is attested in Richard Stanyhurst's 1583 translation of the Aeneid and the first edition of the Oxford English Dictionary suggested this usage may indicate the origin of the term fetch.

Accounts of the origin of fetch are complicated by a word faecce, found in two textually-related Old English glossaries, the Corpus Glossary and the First Cleopatra Glossary. Faecce could in theory be an Old English form of modern English fetch. In the glossaries, faecce is given as a lemma (a word to be glossed); given that most such words in these glossaries are in Latin, it ought to be a Latin word, but no such Latin word is known, leading some scholars to suggest it may be Old Irish. Since it is glossed with the Old English word mære, which denotes female supernatural being associated with causing illness and nightmares, it could be the origin of the Hiberno-English fetch. Recent research has not arrived at a consensus on this question.

Portents of death not dissimilar to later fetch traditions are found in early Irish literature and are associated with the Old Irish term fáith ("seer"): Fedelm issues prophecies of death in Táin Bó Cuailnge; Cormac Connloinges sees a sinister vision of a woman washing bloody chariot wheels in Bruiden Da Choca; a hag prophecies the death of Conaire in Togail Bruidne Da Derga; and in Cath Maige Tuired, the Mórrigán likewise prophesies death. Similar ideas are also found in the Old Norse idea of the fylgja and these are relevant to understanding Irish tradition because of the importance of the Vikings in Ireland. The fylgja, which in Norse mythology denoted an alter ego, usually in animal form, connected to a person's fate. Unlike the Irish concept, the fylgja is almost always female. On these grounds, William Sayers has argued that the term fetch originated as a Hiberno-English form of Irish fáith.

Appearances in literature
Corresponding to its contemporary prominence in "national superstitions", the fetch appeared in Irish literature starting in early 19th century. "The fetch superstition" is the topic of John and Michael Banim's Gothic story "The Fetches" from their 1825 work Tales by the O'Hara Family and Walter Scott used the term in his Letters on Demonology and Witchcraft, published in 1830, in a brief reference to "his ... fetch or wraith, or double-ganger".

Patrick Kennedy's 1866 folklore collection Legendary Fiction of the Irish Celts includes a brief account of "The Doctor's Fetch", in which a fetch's appearance signals death for the titular doctor. More recently, "The Fetch" is the malevolent narrator of Patrick McCabe's 2010 novel The Stray Sod Country, wherein it temporarily inhabits the bodies of the residents of a small Irish town, causing them to commit both psychological and physical harm to themselves and others.

Robert Aickman's 1980 collection of "strange stories" Intrusions: Strange Tales contains his story "The Fetch". In it, the eponymous "fetch" (actually described as a Scottish Cailleach or "carlin" (hag)) is a portent of impending death for the Leith family, leaving a trail of loch water behind her. The story has most recently been anthologised in a reprint collection of Aickman's work titled The Wine-Dark Sea (London: Faber, 2014).

In Dead Heat by Patricia Briggs, Charles and Anna encounter a fetch pretending to be a preschooler named Amethyst. Charles recites a riddle and the fetch answers "A fetch! A fetch! A fetch!" and turns into a group of twigs in the shape of a girl tied with ribbon.

Appearances in popular culture
An adapted version of a fetch appears in the Dungeons & Dragons role-playing game in the Monstrous Compendium Dragonlance Appendix.
A fetch appears in the Season 15 Doctor Who story Image Of The Fendahl (1977) set in the fictional village of Fetchborough, and Fetch Priory,  both named after the apparition. 
The term Fetch appears in Season 2 of Motherland: Fort Salem
The term also appears in book two of the All Souls Trilogy.
 also plays a part in the 2019 movie, "Dublin Murders"

Notes

References

Irish ghosts
Counterparts